KGNC-FM (97.9 MHz) is a radio broadcast station in Amarillo, Texas, United States. It is the oldest FM station in the Amarillo region. KGNC-FM airs a country music format. The station is owned by Alpha Media LLC. Studios for it and its partners are located in southwest Amarillo near the former Western Plaza shopping center.

KGNC-FM is one of the stations responsible for the activation of the Emergency Alert System in the Amarillo area.

Programming 
The station conducts an annual "Jude Country Cares Radiothon".

History

The current KGNC-FM is the second station to hold that call sign. The first KGNC-FM, also located in Amarillo, debuted on November 25, 1947, at 104.3 MHz, as the first FM station broadcasting in the Texas panhandle. Licensed to the Plains Broadcasting Company, this station ceased operations in 1950.

The new station was assigned the call letters KGNC-FM.

KGNC-FM began broadcasting on December 24, 1958, initially simulcasting its AM sister station, KGNC. Its first day of broadcasting included an early example of stereo transmission, with the sending of a demonstration phonograph record's right-channel audio over KGNC-FM, and the left-channel audio over KGNC.

In 1960, the station began broadcasting programming that was separate from KGNC's.

The station's call letters were changed to KMLT on February 14, 1988, but then back to KGNC-FM on November 2, 1992.

In 1994 the Federal Communications Commission found the Equal Employment Opportunity policies of KGNC and KGNC-FM to be deficient. The stations were notified of a fine of an apparent liability of $25,000, and given shorter than usual license renewals.

References

External links
KGNC-FM website

FCC History Cards for KGNC-FM (covering 1958–1981)

GNC-FM
Country radio stations in the United States
Radio stations established in 1958
1958 establishments in Texas
Alpha Media radio stations